Haemanota is a genus of moths in the family Erebidae. The genus was erected by George Hampson in 1901.

Species

Haemanota abdominalis (Rothschild, 1909)
Haemanota affinis (Rothschild, 1909)
Haemanota alboapicalis (Rothschild, 1909)
Haemanota beneluzi Toulgoët, 2001
Haemanota chrysozona (Schaus, 1905)
Haemanota concelata Laguerre, 2005
Haemanota croceicauda (Toulgoët, 1987)
Haemanota croceicorpus (Toulgoët, 1990)
Haemanota fallaciosa (Toulgoët, 1995)
Haemanota fereunicolor (Toulgoët, 1987)
Haemanota flavipurpurea (Dognin, 1914)
Haemanota gibeauxi (Toulgoët, 1989)
Haemanota griseotincta (Rothschild, 1909)
Haemanota haemabasis (Dognin, 1914)
Haemanota hermieri Toulgoët, 2000
Haemanota improvisa (Dognin, 1923)
Haemanota kindli Toulgoët, 1992
Haemanota kindliana Toulgoët, 2001
Haemanota maculosa (Schaus, 1905)
Haemanota nigricollum (Dognin, 1892)
Haemanota patricki (Toulgoët, 1990)
Haemanota prophaea (Schaus, 1905)
Haemanota rubriceps Hampson, 1901
Haemanota sanguidorsia (Schaus, 1905)
Haemanota senecauxi Toulgoët, 1992
Haemanota syntomoides (Rothschild, 1910)
Haemanota vicinula Toulgoët, 1997

References
 , 2005: Descriptions of three new species of Arctiidae from French Guiana (Lepidoptera: Arctiidae: Arctiinae). Lambillionea CV dec.: 521-529.
 , 1992: Reclassement d'Arctiidae néotropicales actuellement en attente d'un reclassement générique correct, avec description de duex espèces nouvelles (Lepidoptera: Arctiidae). Nouvelle Revue d'Entomologie 9 (4): 339-344.
 , 1997: Descriptions d'une nouvelle Arctiide d'Amérique du Sud avec transfèrts de quatre espèces dans les genres Haemanota Hampson 1901 et Trichromia Hübner 1816 (Lepidoptera: Arctiidae: Arctiinae). Nouvelle Revue d'Entomologie 14 (1): 85-90.
 , 2001: Description de nouvelles Arctiides néotropicales et d'un nouveau genre (Lepidoptera: Arctiidae: Arctiinae) 68ème note. Nouvelle Revue d'Entomologie 18 (2): 113-121.

External links

 
Phaegopterina
Moth genera